Carrollton School of the Sacred Heart is a Catholic college preparatory day school for girls, founded in 1961 in Coconut Grove, Miami, Florida.

Description
Carrollton School of the Sacred Heart was founded in 1961. Its oldest building, El Jardin, built in 1918, was donated to the Society of the Sacred Heart by the O’Neil family. The school now resides across two campuses in Coconut Grove, Florida, and still uses El Jardin for classes, along with many other buildings. Carrollton has a student population of around 862.

A member of the Network of Sacred Heart Schools, Carrollton is divided into five independent learning communities or schools: Montessori, Primary, Intermediate, Junior High and High School.

Carrollton has a nationally recognized debate and robotics team. In 2007, the school hosted a national robotics competition. Its athletic mascot is the Carrollton Cyclone.

History
In 2019, the school had plans to build an elementary school for boys on the property of Villa Woodbine, which prompted complaints from area residents.

Alumnae
 Sofia Carson, actress
 Lauren Jauregui, member of Fifth Harmony
 Ana Navarro, political strategist and television commentator
 Génesis Rodríguez, actress

Notes and references

External links
Carrollton's website
Network of Sacred Heart Schools
 

Girls' schools in Florida
International Baccalaureate schools in Florida
Educational institutions established in 1961
Catholic elementary schools in Florida
Catholic secondary schools in Florida
Roman Catholic Archdiocese of Miami
Education in Miami
Private K-12 schools in Miami-Dade County, Florida
Sacred Heart schools in the United States
Coconut Grove (Miami)
1961 establishments in Florida